Basil Onomagoulos was a Byzantine official who was declared rival emperor in Sicily in 717, taking the regnal name Tiberius.

Basil was from Constantinople, the son of a certain Gregory Onomagoulos. In 717 he was a member of the entourage of Sergius, the Byzantine governor of Sicily, when news arrived to the island of the fall of Constantinople, the Byzantine imperial capital, to an Arab siege. At this point Sergius declared Basil as emperor, taking the name Tiberius. The Emperor Leo III the Isaurian (r. 717–741) however quickly dispatched a chartoularios named Paul, whom he named patrikios and strategos of Sicily, with a few men and imperial instructions for the army. On his arrival, the people of Syracuse and the army surrendered the rebels. Basil and his head general were beheaded and their heads sent to the emperor, while the other rebels were tonsured or mutilated and exiled. Sergius himself managed to escape to the Lombards in mainland Italy, and returned only after he received guarantees that no harm would befall him.

Sources 
 
 
 

7th-century births
717 deaths
Year of birth unknown
8th-century Byzantine people

Byzantine usurpers
Executed Byzantine people
People executed by decapitation
Byzantine Sicily
People from Constantinople
8th-century executions by the Byzantine Empire
Leo III the Isaurian